Gregory P. Schmidt (May 3, 1947 – August 24, 2016) was an American who devoted his life to public service. He was the Secretary of the Senate for the California State Legislature from August 1996 until October 2014, serving concurrently as the Chief Executive Officer for the California Senate Rules Committee.

Earlier in his career, Schmidt served as a consultant to Assembly Committees on Human Resources; Labor, Employment and Consumer Affairs, and later as Staff Director to the State Senate Committee on Judiciary. He received his bachelor's degree from Santa Clara University in 1969 and his master's degree in history from the University of California, Berkeley in 1973.

Schmidt died of cancer on August 24, 2016 at the age of 69.

References

1947 births
2016 deaths
Politicians from Oakland, California
University of California, Berkeley alumni
Santa Clara University alumni